The Ardal Southern Cup is a football knockout tournament involving teams who play in the tier 3 Ardal South East and South West Leagues, administered by the Football Association of Wales.

Competition history
The first season of the competition was meant to be the 2020–21 season but the competition was cancelled due to the Coronavirus pandemic. The competition instead started in the 2021–22 season.

Past winners

2020s

 2020–21: – No competition
 2021–22: – Trethomas Bluebirds

Details of competition finals

Number of titles by winning clubs since 2020s

Notes and references

See also
Ardal North Cup, the corresponding cup for clubs from the two northern Ardal Leagues.

External links
Ardal Leagues Southern Cup

Football cup competitions in Wales
Football in Wales
Recurring sporting events established in 2020
2020 establishments in Wales